Marcum-Illinois Union Elementary School District is a public school district in Sutter County, California, United States.

References

External links
 

School districts in Sutter County, California